Monsters of Rock was an annual hard rock and heavy metal music festival held in Castle Donington, England, from 1980 to 1996, taking place every year except 1989 and 1993. It later branched into other locations such as the Netherlands, Poland, Spain, Italy, Germany, France, Sweden, Argentina, Brazil, Chile, the United States, and the Soviet Union.

History
In 1980, promoter Paul Loasby, along with Maurice Jones, planned a one-day festival dedicated specifically for bands within the hard rock and heavy metal genre. Loasby was an established and successful promoter working that year on the Rainbow UK tour and penned the festival as the final show of the tour for the band to headline. Jones knew the owner of the Donington Park race track, Tom Wheatcroft, located next to the village of Castle Donington in Leicestershire, England, and the site was chosen to host the event.

(A year earlier, promoter Bill Graham’s July 1979 Day on the Green Festival at Oakland Coliseum in California was also dubbed "The Monsters of Rock" show. This concert featured Aerosmith, Ted Nugent and AC/DC.)

Donington Park was unknown as a major location but its location in the East Midlands next to the M1 and A42 allowed for better transportation to the site from around the country. Additionally the site ground level sloped which allowed for a better viewing for the audience throughout the site.

The first Monsters of Rock line-up consisted of a mix of British and international bands and was a success with 35,000 heavy metal fans attending. Although only conceived as a one-off event, it was mentioned on the day the idea that the festival will return the following year and the first edition birthed what would become a regular festival for the next 15 years, becoming synonymous as a Mecca for fans of the genre and further establishing the Midlands as the home of heavy metal.

Over the years, the attendance continued to grow, reaching 107,000 in 1988, when two fans died during the Guns N' Roses set. Initially the blame was thought to be the size of the crowd and a rush forward during the band's set but officially the cause is laid on the weather, causing muddy and wet conditions on the sloping ground. As a result, the festival did not take place in 1989, and it was replaced that year by a two-day festival similar to Monsters of Rock, the Moscow Music Peace Festival in Russia, which included performances by several Monsters of Rock veterans Bon Jovi, Ozzy Osbourne, Mötley Crüe and Scorpions. Monsters of Rock returned the year after with a limitation to the crowd of 75,000.

The festival had been held in parallel in West Germany from 1983 to 1991. In 1984 and 1986 the festival branched into Sweden. In 1988, the festival occurred for the first time in France, Italy, Spain and the Netherlands. It was held as a one-time event in 1991 in Soviet Union (one of the largest concerts of all time, with an estimated audience of over 1.6 million), Poland, Belgium, Hungary. In 1994, the festival was exported overseas to Chile, Argentina and Brazil.

In 1993 the Monsters of Rock radio show debuted in the United States with host Harlan Hendrickson. Guests on the show include everyone from AC/DC, KISS, Van Halen, Judas Priest, Motörhead, Cinderella, Ozzy Osbourne, Bon Jovi, Cheap Trick, Mötley Crüe, Ratt, Dio, Y&T, Guns N' Roses, Slayer and Poison.

The Monsters of Rock festival continued on as the premier hard rock and heavy metal event in Great Britain in the 1990s but started to fall upon hard times as heavy metal became less popular, with another cancellation in 1993 due to being unable to find a strong enough headliner. In 1995 the festival found itself in a similar situation until Metallica agreed to play with the condition of the band having control over the event and naming it "Escape from the Studio". In 1996 Ozzy Osbourne and KISS co-headlined the festival and although there were plans to extend the festival into a two-day event in 1997, the promoters once again found themselves in a struggle for headliners and the event was cancelled and discontinued.

Donington Park remained event-less until 2001 when the Rock and Blues Festival and Stereophonics held events at the site. In 2002 the Ozzfest tour returned to the UK using Donington Park as their only British event and the following year Live Nation picked up the reins as Monsters of Rock's successor in the name of Download Festival. An outstanding success from the offset, the festival continues to this day having increased to a three-day event with five stages, though as of 2008 the event has been relegated outside of the track.

In 2006, the Monsters of Rock name was revived and held at the National Bowl in Milton Keynes, England, for a one-off event headlined by Deep Purple and with Alice Cooper as a special guest.

In 2012 Harlan Hendrickson & Monsters of Rock Worldwide partnered with Larry Morand and Mike London to launch the inaugural Monsters Of Rock Cruise.

Line-ups
(Note: Line-ups in this section are for the events held in the United Kingdom. They are listed with the headlining band first, followed by the reverse order of appearance by the other bands.)

1980
16 August 1980
Rainbow
Judas Priest
Scorpions
April Wine
Saxon (released as the semi-official live album . "I still meet people," noted Biff Byford, "that come up and tell me about their own little twist on the day: 'Just as you started 747 (Strangers In The Night), a plane came over.' Of course, we wrote a song about [the event]: And the Bands Played On.")
Riot
Touch

1981
22 August 1981

AC/DC
Whitesnake
Blue Öyster Cult
Slade
Blackfoot
More
Tommy Vance (DJ)

1982
21 August 1982

Status Quo
Gillan
Saxon (the first band to appear twice)
Hawkwind
Uriah Heep
Anvil
Tommy Vance (DJ)

1983
20 August 1983
Whitesnake
Meat Loaf
ZZ Top
Twisted Sister
Dio
Diamond Head
Tommy Vance (DJ)

1984
18 August 1984

AC/DC (first band to headline twice)
Van Halen (David Lee Roth's final appearance with Van Halen in the UK)
Ozzy Osbourne
Gary Moore
Y&T (not at Karlsruhe)
Accept
DIO
Mötley Crüe
Tommy Vance (DJ)

1985
17 August 1985
ZZ Top
Marillion
Bon Jovi
Metallica
Ratt
Magnum
Tommy Vance (DJ)

1986
16 August 1986

Ozzy Osbourne
Scorpions
Def Leppard (drummer Rick Allen's first major concert appearance after his 1984 car accident which resulted in the loss of his arm).
Mötorhead
Bad News
Warlock (first time a female performed at the festival)

1987
22 August 1987
Bon Jovi
Dio
Metallica
Anthrax
W.A.S.P.
Cinderella
 The Bailey Brothers (DJs)

1988
20 August 1988
 Iron Maiden (the show released as part of Eddie's Archive)
 KISS ("It wasn't Kiss at its very best," recalled Paul Stanley. "We were on during the day, and we didn't even have our standard show at that point when we were out of makeup. But, in some ways, Donington is a great type of boot camp, because you can't depend upon anything other than guts and glory to make something work.")
 David Lee Roth
 Megadeth
 Guns N' Roses
 Helloween

1990
18 August 1990

The entire 1990 festival was simultaneously broadcast live on BBC Radio 1, which had previously recorded many festivals for later broadcast.

Whitesnake (recorded as Live at Donington 1990)
Aerosmith
Poison
Quireboys
Thunder

1991
17 August 1991

 AC/DC (their portion released as Live at Donington)
 Metallica
 Mötley Crüe
 Queensrÿche
 The Black Crowes

1992
22 August 1992 (this was also broadcast live on Radio 1)

Iron Maiden (recorded as Live at Donington)
Skid Row
Thunder
Slayer
W.A.S.P.
The Almighty (recorded as a bonus disk on Powertrippin')

1994
4 June 1994 (another festival broadcast live; highlights were transmitted in 1995 and 1996)

This was the first year that two stages were used. Readers of Kerrang! magazine were invited to vote on bands to appear at the festival, and Extreme easily won the right to appear second on the bill.

Main stage:
 Aerosmith
Extreme
Sepultura
Pantera
Therapy?
Pride & Glory

Second Stage:
The Wildhearts
Terrorvision
Skin
Biohazard
Cry of Love
Headswim

1995
26 August 1995

1995 was not officially billed as 'Monsters of Rock' but as 'Escape from the Studio' due to Metallica's decision to headline while recording the Load album.

Metallica (Their fourth appearance and only appearance as headliner)
Therapy?
Skid Row
Slayer
Slash's Snakepit
White Zombie
Machine Head
Warrior Soul
Corrosion of Conformity

1996
17 August 1996. Ozzy Osbourne and Kiss co-headlined with Kiss being the final band on stage.

Main stage:
KISS and Ozzy Osbourne
Sepultura performed as a three piece as frontman Max Cavalera was absent due to the death of his stepson. 
Biohazard
Dog Eat Dog
Paradise Lost
Fear Factory

Kerrang! Stage:
Korn
Type O Negative
Everclear
3 Colours Red
Honeycrack
Cecil

2006
3 June 2006 – Milton Keynes Bowl
Deep Purple
Alice Cooper
Thunder
Queensrÿche
Journey
Ted Nugent
Roadstar

International Events

1983 West Germany Tour
West Germany: Dortmund, Westfalenhallen – 2 September 1983 Kaiserslautern, Waldstadion am Erbsenberg – 3 September 1983
Nürnberg, Zeppelinfeld – 4 September 1983
 Whitesnake
 Blue Öyster Cult
 Thin Lizzy
 Saxon
 Meat Loaf
 Motörhead
 Twisted Sister

1984 North European Tour
Sweden: Stockholm, Råsunda Stadium – 25 August 1984
 AC/DC
 Van Halen
 Mötley Crüe

West Germany: Karlsruhe, Wildparkstadion – 1 September 1984
West Germany: Nuremberg, Zeppelinfeld – 2 September 1984
 AC/DC
 Van Halen
 Ozzy Osbourne
 Dio
 Gary Moore
 Accept
 Mötley Crüe

1986 North European Tour
Sweden Stockholm, Råsunda Stadium – 23 August 1986
 Scorpions
 Ozzy Osbourne
 Def Leppard
 Zero Nine

West Germany: Nuremberg, Zeppelinfeld – 30 August 1986
West Germany: Mannheim, Maimarktgelände – 31 August 1986
 Scorpions
 Ozzy Osbourne
  M.S.G. (McAuley Schenker Group)
 Def Leppard
 Bon Jovi
Warlock

1987 European Tour
Italy: Reggio Emilia, Aeroporto di Reggio Emilia – 26 August 1987
Dio
Helloween
Skanners
Black Swan
Gow

West Germany: Nuremberg, Messegelände – 29 August 1987
West Germany: Pforzheim, Stadion im Brötzinger Tal – 30 August 1987
 Deep Purple
 Dio
 Metallica
 Ratt
 Cinderella
 Helloween
 Pretty Maids (Due to technical reasons, their show in Pforzheim was cancelled)

1988 USA & Europe Tour

USA: 23 May – 30 July
 Van Halen
 Scorpions
 Dokken
 Metallica
 Kingdom Come

West Germany: Schweinfurt, Mainwiesen Gelände – 27 August 1988
West Germany: Bochum, Ruhrland Stadion – 28 August 1988
 Iron Maiden
 KISS
 David Lee Roth
 Anthrax
 Testament (Megadeth cancelled)
 Great White
 Treat (did not play in Bochum)

Netherlands: Tilburg, Willem II Stadion – 4 September 1988
 Iron Maiden
 David Lee Roth
 KISS
 Anthrax
 Helloween
 Great White

Italy: Modena, Festa de l'Unità – 10 September 1988
 Iron Maiden
 KISS
 Anthrax
 Helloween
 Kings of the Sun
 R.A.F.

Spain: Pamplona, Plaza de Toros – 17 September 1988
Spain: Madrid, Casa de Campo – 18 September 1988
Spain: Barcelona, Plaza de Toros – 22 September 1988
 Iron Maiden
 Metallica
 Anthrax
 Helloween
 Manzano

France: Paris, Palais Omnisports de Paris-Bercy – 24 & 25 September 1988
 Iron Maiden
 Trust – The live album Paris by night was recorded on 25 September
 Anthrax
 Helloween

1990 European Tour

Sweden: Stockholm, Stockholm Globe Arena – 21 August 1990
 Whitesnake
 Poison
 The Quireboys

West Germany: West Berlin, Waldbühne – 23 August 1990
 Whitesnake
 Aerosmith
 Poison

West Germany: Dortmund, Westfalenhallen – 25 August 1990
 Whitesnake
 Aerosmith
 Dio
 Poison
 Vixen
 The Front

Netherlands: Utrecht, Stadion Galgenwaard – 26 August 1990
 Whitesnake
 Aerosmith
 Poison
 Quireboys

Italy: Bologna, Arena Parco Nord – 30 August 1990
 Whitesnake
 Aerosmith
 Poison
 The Quireboys
 Faith No More
 Vixen
 The Front

West Germany: Mannheim, Maimarktgelände – 1 September 1990
 Whitesnake
 Aerosmith
 Dio
 Poison
 Vixen
 The Front
  

Note: This particular show was promoted as "Super Rock 1990".

France: Paris, Hippodrome de Vincennes – 3 September 1990
 Whitesnake
 Aerosmith
 Poison
 The Front
 Faith No More
 Face to Face
 Quireboys
Note: Face to Face was a French band related to Trust. Faith No More was not on the ticket list but was present to the show.

1991 European Tour
Denmark: Copenhagen, Gentofte Stadion – 10 August 1991
 AC/DC
 Metallica
 Queensrÿche
 The Black Crowes

Poland: Chorzów, Śląski Stadion – 13 August 1991
 AC/DC
 Metallica
 Queensrÿche

Hungary: Budapest, Népstadion – 22 August 1991
 AC/DC
 Metallica
 Mötley Crüe
 Queensrÿche

Germany: München, Galopprennbahn München Riem, 24 August 1991
 AC/DC
 Metallica
 Mötley Crüe
 Queensrÿche
 The Black Crowes

Switzerland: Basel, St. Jakobs Stadium, 25 August 1991
 AC/DC
 Metallica
 Mötley Crüe
 Queensrÿche
 The Black Crowes
Belgium: Hasselt, Belgium, Domein Kiewit – 30 August 1991
 AC/DC
 Metallica
 Mötley Crüe
 Queensrÿche

Netherlands: Nijmegen, Goffert Stadion – 1 September 1991
 AC/DC
 Metallica
 Queensrÿche
 The Black Crowes

Germany: Mainz, Finthen Army Airfield – 7 September 1991
 AC/DC
 Metallica
 Mötley Crüe
 Queensrÿche
 The Black Crowes

Austria: Graz, Liebenauer Stadion – 11 September 1991
 AC/DC
 Metallica
 Queensrÿche

Italy: Modena, Festa dell'Unità – 14 September 1991
 AC/DC
 Metallica
 Queensrÿche
 The Black Crowes
 Negazione

France: Paris, Hippodrome de Vincennes – 21 September 1991
 AC/DC
 Metallica
 Queensrÿche
 The Black Crowes
 Patrick Rondat

Spain: Barcelona, Estadio Olímpico Lluís Companys – 25 September 1991
 Legion
 Tesla
 Metallica
 AC/DC

Soviet Union: Moscow, Tushino Airfield – 28 September 1991
 AC/DC
 Metallica
 Pantera
 The Black Crowes
 E.S.T. (Russian heavy metal band)
Partially released as For Those About to Rock, Monsters in Moscow. The versions of "Whole Lotta Rosie" and "The Jack" that AC/DC performed at this concert, were released on two of AC/DC's live albums, AC/DC Live and AC/DC Live: 2 CD Collector's Edition. Metallica's performances of "Harvester of Sorrow" and "Creeping Death" from this show were used as B-sides for the "Sad but True" single in different regional editions. Pantera's "Cowboys from Hell" performance is featured as a playable song in the video games Guitar Hero Smash Hits and Rock Band 4. Tushino Airfield was recreated as a virtual venue in Guitar Hero Metallica.

1992 South European tour
Italy: Reggio Emilia, Arena Festa Nazionale Dell'Unita' – 12 September 1992

 Iron Maiden – the song "Heaven Can Wait" of A Real Live One album was recorded there
 Black Sabbath
 Megadeth
 Pantera
 Testament
 Warrant
 
The bands Danzig and Gun both canceled their appearances at the festival. They are featured on the poster for the event.

Spain: Barcelona, Plaza de Toros – 14 September 1992
Spain: San Sebastián, Velódromo de Anoeta – 17 September 1992
Spain: Madrid, Las Arenas Plaza de Toros – 18 September 1992
Spain: Zaragoza, Municipal Tent – 19 September 1992

 Iron Maiden
 Megadeth
 Pantera
 Gun

1994 South American Tour
Brazil: São Paulo, Estádio do Pacaembu – 27 August 1994
KISS
Slayer
Black Sabbath (with Tony Martin on vocals) 
Suicidal Tendencies
Angra
Viper
Raimundos
Dr. Sin

Chile: Santiago, Estación Mapocho – 1 September 1994
 Kiss
 Black Sabbath (with Tony Martin on vocals)
 Slayer
 

Argentina: Buenos Aires, River Plate Stadium – 3 September 1994
KISS (Headliner)
Black Sabbath (with Tony Martin on vocals)
Slayer
Hermética (Manowar was announced but never got to play)

1995 South American Tour
Brazil: São Paulo, Estádio do Pacaembu – September 1995

2nd
Ozzy Osbourne
Alice Cooper
Faith No More
Megadeth
Therapy?
Paradise Lost
Virna Lisi
Rata Blanca
Clawfinger

Chile: Santiago, Teatro Caupolicán – September 1995

8th
 Alice Cooper
 Megadeth
 Clawfinger
 Therapy?

9th
 Ozzy Osbourne
 Faith No More
 Paradise Lost

Argentina: Buenos Aires, Ferro Carril Oeste Stadium – September 1995

9th
Alice Cooper
Megadeth
Clawfinger
Therapy?
Rata Blanca

10th
Ozzy Osbourne
Faith No More
Paradise Lost
Logos
Malón

1996 Brazil
Brazil: São Paulo, Estádio do Pacaembu – 24 August 1996

 Iron Maiden
 Skid Row
 Motörhead
 Biohazard
 Raimundos
 Helloween
 King Diamond
 Mercyful Fate
 Héroes del Silencio

This event marked the last performance of the original lineup of Skid Row, before parting with singer Sebastian Bach and drummer Rob Affuso.

1997 Argentina
Argentina: Buenos Aires, Ferro Carril Oeste Stadium – 13 December 1997
Whitesnake (Headliner)
Megadeth
Pantera
Queensrÿche
Riff (Argentine band)

1998 South American Tour
Brazil: São Paulo - Estádio Ícaro de Castro Melo - near Ibirapuera Park – 26 September 1998
 Slayer
 Megadeth
 Manowar
 Dream Theater
 Saxon
 Savatage
 Glenn Hughes
 Korzus
 Dorsal Atlântica
Van Halen was supposed to be the headliner, but it never became official or happened.

Chile: Santiago, Velódromo Estadio Nacional – 10 December 1998
 Slayer
 Anthrax
 Helloween
 Criminal
 Panzer
Iron Maiden was going to appear at the festival as a headliner, but they were forced to cancel due to the arrest of Augusto Pinochet in London.

Argentina: Buenos Aires, Vélez Sársfield Stadium – 12 December 1998
 Iron Maiden
 Slayer
 Soulfly
 Helloween
 Angra
 O'Connor

1999 Argentina
Argentina: Buenos Aires, River Plate Stadium – 14 May 1999
 Metallica
 Sepultura
 Catupecu Machu
 Almafuerte
Marilyn Manson was going to appear at the festival, but they were forced to cancel due to the Columbine High School massacre

2004 Italy
Italy: Como, Stadio Sinigaglia – 13 July 2004
 Deep Purple
 Status Quo
 Cheap Trick
 Settevite

2005 South American Tour
Argentina: Buenos Aires, Ferro Carril Oeste Stadium – 11 September 2005
 Judas Priest
 Whitesnake
 Rata Blanca
 Tristemente Celebres
 

Chile: Santiago, Pista Atlética Estadio Nacional – 13 September 2005
 Whitesnake
 Judas Priest
 Rata Blanca
 Dorso
 Fiskales Ad-Hok

2006 Spain
Spain: Zaragoza, Feria de Zaragoza – 18 June 2006
 Primal Fear
 Saxon
 Apocalyptica
 W.A.S.P.
 Whitesnake
 Scorpions

2007 Spain
Spain: Zaragoza, Feria de Zaragoza – June 2007

22nd
 Ozzy Osbourne
 Children of Bodom
 Megadeth
 Mägo de Oz
 Black Label Society
 Brujeria

23rd
 Motörhead
 Slayer
 Dream Theater
 Blind Guardian
 Pretty Maids
 Kamelot
 Mastodon
 Riverside

2008 Chile & Spain
Chile: Santiago, Pista Atlética Estadio Nacional – 1 April 2008
 Ozzy Osbourne (Headliner)
 Korn
 Black Label Society

Spain: Zaragoza, Feria de Zaragoza – July 2008

11th
Deep Purple (Cancelled)
Thin Lizzy
Twisted Sister (Cancelled)
Ted Nugent
Saxon (Cancelled)
Pretty Maids
Candlemass
Rage

12th (Cancelled due to rain)
Iron Maiden
Slayer
Avantasia
Iced Earth
Avenged Sevenfold
Lauren Harris
Rose Tattoo
Baron Rojo
Leyenda
Jobis Bay

2013 Brazil
Brazil: São Paulo, Anhembi Convention Center – October 2013

19th
Slipknot
Korn
Limp Bizkit
Killswitch Engage
Hatebreed
Gojira
Project46

20th
Aerosmith
Whitesnake
Ratt
Geoff Tate's Queensrÿche
Buckcherry
Dokken

2015 South American Tour
Brazil: São Paulo, Anhembi Convention Center – April 2015

25th
Ozzy Osbourne
Judas Priest
Motörhead (Due to illness, Lemmy Kilmister couldn't perform. Remaining members Phil Campbell and Mikkey Dee jammed a few Motörhead songs with musicians from Sepultura).
Black Veil Brides
Rival Sons
Coal Chamber
Primal Fear

26th
Kiss
Judas Priest
Manowar
Accept
Unisonic
Yngwie Malmsteen
Steel Panther

Attend/Capacity/Gross Sales: 72,337 / 76,428 / $6,365,540 (1 sellout)

Brazil: Curitiba, Pedreira Paulo Leminski – 28 April 2015

Ozzy Osbourne
Judas Priest
Motörhead

Attend/Capacity/Gross Sales: 12,820 / 20,000 / $1,038,600

Brazil: Porto Alegre, Estádio Passo d'Areia – 30 April 2015

Ozzy Osbourne
Judas Priest
Motörhead
Zerodoze

Attend/Capacity/Gross Sales: 14,199 / 19,600 / $997,006

Argentina: Buenos Aires, Ciudad del Rock – 2 May 2015

Ozzy Osbourne
Judas Priest
Motörhead
Carajo
Malón
Plan 4
El Buen Salvaje

Attend/Capacity/Gross Sales: 26,354 / 35,000 / $1,304,240

2016 Germany
Germany: Sankt Goarshausen, Loreley Freilichtbühne – 17 June 2016; Bietigheim-Bissingen, Festplatz am Viadukt - 18 June 2016

Rainbow
Manfred Mann's Earth Band
Thin Lizzy

2017 Argentina
Argentina: Buenos Aires, Tecnopolis – 4 November 2017

Megadeth
Rata Blanca
Anthrax
Vimic
Plan 4

2023 Brazil
Brazil: São Paulo, Allianz Parque – 22 April 2023

Kiss
Scorpions 
Deep Purple
Helloween
Candlemass
Symphony X
Doro

In popular culture 
Saxon wrote the song "And the Bands Played On" about their appearance at the 1980 festival.

The 1986 appearance by Bad News was featured in the TV mockumentary More Bad News.

In 1993, the Monsters of Rock radio show debuted. Harlan Hendrickson, host and creator of the Monsters of Rock, broadcasts from the  rock radio station WRIF in Detroit. The Monsters of Rock is currently syndicated nationally/internationally through United Stations Radio Networks where it currently airs in over 60 markets in the United States alone. The program currently holds the number-one or number-two slots among males 25–54 on the majority of stations that carry it. Guests on the show have included of AC/DC, Kiss, Van Halen, Motörhead, Cinderella, Ozzy Osbourne, Bon Jovi, Cheap Trick, Mötley Crüe, Ratt, Slayer and Poison.

In 1994, Beavis and Butt-Head episode "Take A Number", Beavis and Butt-Head attempt to get tickets to Creatures of Rock which is a parody of Monsters of Rock

In the 2005 Half Man Half Biscuit song "Mate of the Bloke" on their album Achtung Bono, the protagonist sings of legal action taken against him by More O'Ferrall for spraying the legend "in church hall if wet" onto a billboard for Monsters of Rock.

In 2012, Harlan Hendrickson teamed up with Larry Morand and Mike London to launch the "Monsters of Rock Cruise", which is a multi day music cruise celebrating the Castle Donington festival. Artists such as Saxon, UFO, Cinderella, Tesla, The Quireboys and others from the original festival have been featured on the cruise.

See also 
 List of Donington Park Festivals
 Download Festival

References

External links 
 Monsters of Rock Donington 1980–90

Music festivals in Leicestershire
Heavy metal festivals in the United Kingdom
Rock festivals in the United Kingdom
Concert tours
AC/DC concert tours
Recurring events established in 1980